The 2022–23 season is the 116th season in the history of Spezia Calcio and their third consecutive season in the top flight. The club are participating in Serie A and the Coppa Italia.

Season overview
On 1 July 2022, Spezia announced Luca Gotti as their new head coach on a two-year contract, replacing Thiago Motta.

Players

First-team squad

Out on loan

Pre-season and friendlies

Competitions

Overall record

Serie A

League table

Results summary

Results by round

Matches 
The league fixtures were announced on 24 June 2022.

Coppa Italia

References

Spezia Calcio seasons
Spezia